Citibank Ecuador is a unit of Citigroup of New York City, with its roots in Ecuador dating back to 1960.  Citi Ecuador is headquartered in Quito, with offices in Guayaquil.

Citi's agencies are located in:

Quito
República de El Salvador N36-230 y Naciones Unidas. Edificio Citiplaza (Headquarters)
Guayaquil
Av. Constitución y Juan Tanca Marengo. Edificio Executive Center (Offices)

External links
 Official Website

Citigroup
Banks established in 1950
Banks of Ecuador